Trisha Shetty (born 16 September 1990) is an Indian activist for gender equity and the founder of SheSays. She is known for human rights advocacy, especially advocating for gender-sensitive policies and law, quality education, youth and gender representation and preventing sexual violence in India. Her work and advocacy has been recognised by the United Nations, President Obama, Her Majesty, Queen Elizabeth II and President Emmanuel Macron. She currently serves as the President of the Steering Committee of the Paris Peace Forum, an international summit launched in 2018, under the leadership of President Macron; to promote good global governance. She is also part of the 8 member Global Leadership Advisory Council of the Museum for the United Nations - UN Live, alongside Ban Ki-moon; Former UN Secretary-General and Darren Walker; President, Ford Foundation. Shetty was named one of India's "7 Most Powerful Warriors" by India Today and was one of the honourees of the Vogue India Woman of the Year Award. She was also inducted as one of the 12 Obama Foundation Scholars at Columbia University in the inaugural batch. Trisha publicly shared her story of child sexual abuse for the first time in 2019, in a TED Talk titled, "Embrace your scars, be your own hero"  as part of a special edition of TED conference broadcast on Television, hosted by and in collaboration with the Actor, Shah Rukh Khan.

Early life and education 
Trisha Shetty was born in Mumbai, Maharashtra India. She completed her bachelor's degree in Political Science and Psychology from Jai Hind College, University of Mumbai. She then graduated as a lawyer from the University of Mumbai. In 2018, she was selected as an Obama Foundation Scholar to complete a 1-year specialised training, educational and mentorship program at Columbia University in New York City. The inaugural Obama Scholars cohort is composed of twelve accomplished leaders, who are participating in an immersive program that brings together academic, skills-based and experiential learning, designed by Columbia University in consultation with the Obama Foundation.

Career and activism 

Shetty founded SheSays in August 2015. SheSays is a youth-led movement to advance gender equality through a multidimensional approach. Trisha shared her personal story of child sexual abuse and her journey to start SheSays for the first time in November 2019 through her TED talk, "Embrace your scars, be your own hero." Her talk was aired on television across Star Plus and Star World in English and Hindi. She spoke as part of a special series developed by TED in collaboration with the actor, Shah Rukh Khan and Star TV Network. The talk was translated in multiple regional Indian languages and was broadcast digitally via TED, Hotstar and NatGeo.

In 2016, the United Nations Secretary-General Ban Ki-moon and Secretary-General's Envoy on Youth announced Shetty as one of 17 youth leaders selected for the inaugural class of UN Youth Leaders for the Sustainable Development Goals. Shetty was selected for her leadership and contribution to end gender inequality and injustice by 2030.

In 2017, Shetty was named on the Forbes 30 Under 30 list under the categories Pioneer Women and Social Entrepreneur. She also delivered the keynote address at the UN ECOSOC Youth Forum, 2017.

In March 2018, Shetty was selected as one of the 13 Indian's to join the inaugural Young Leaders India-France Club launched by French President Emmanuel Macron, during his State visit to India. The Club Young Leaders India-France aims to build an influential advisory network to promote Indo-French bilateral action.

In June 2018, Shetty was inducted into the final Queen's Young Leader Cohort by Her Majesty Queen Elizabeth at Buckingham Palace. As a Queen's Young Leader, Shetty received specialised training and mentorship and was invited to a reception hosted by Prime Minister Theresa May at 10 Downing Street.

Shetty was also co-contributor to the Sunday Times best seller, Feminists Don't Wear Pink (2018), a collection of short stories by activists and female leaders to raise money for the United Nations initiative Girl Up.

On International Day of the Girl Child, Shetty assisted Michelle Obama to launch the Global Girls Alliance under the Obama Foundation. Shetty joined other celebrities including Zendaya, Karlie Kloss and Jennifer Hudson on Today and urged viewers to take a stand for marginalised girls.

In 2018, Shetty became the vice-president of the Paris Peace Forum Steering Committee and the following year she was named the President of the Steering Committee working with President Macron to host an annual event to support international cooperation and global governance to ensure durable peace.

In response to COVID-19, Trisha Shetty has joined the Lancet-Chatham House Commission as a Health Commissioner on Improving Population Health Post COVID. The commission has been set up with the aim to contribute to international efforts to improve and safeguard the health of populations equitably post COVID-19 by identifying key actions for international, national and local actors that will synergistically

 prevent pandemics
 reduce non-communicable diseases
 protect natural environments

The commission – funded by Wellcome – will run for 18 months, from October 2020 to April 2022, culminating in a Lancet Commission Report to be submitted for publication by April 2022.

In 2021, Shetty also joined the Global Advisory Board of UNLEASH alongside Mr. Nandan Nilekani, co-founder, Infosys and Ms Nena Stoilkovic, Under-Secretary General, International Federation of Red Cross and Red Crescent Societies. UNLEASH is a non-profit founded in 2016 with the aim of developing solutions to the SDGs and building capacity for young people from around the world.

In April 2022, Shetty joined former Prime Minister of Sweden, Mr. Stefan Löfven alongside Mr. Jan Eliasson, Former Deputy Secretary-General of the UN and Minister for Foreign Affairs, Sweden, Ms. Sharan Burrow, General Secretary, International Trade Union Confederation (ITUC), Australia and Anna Sundström, Secretary General, Olof Palme International Center to launch the Common Security 2022 report to mark the 40th anniversary of Olof Palme's Independent Commission on Disarmament and Security Issues. Shetty was part of the High-Level Advisory Commission that consulted on the drafting of the report.

References 

1990 births
Living people
Indian women activists
People from Mumbai
University of Mumbai alumni
Columbia University alumni